Radio Televizija Nikšić, abbreviated as RTNK, is a local radio-television company based in Nikšić, Montenegro. Its radio and television programmes are heard and seen in and around the town of Nikšić.

Television stations in Montenegro
Mass media in Nikšić